Golfo Dulce Forest Reserve, is a protected area in Costa Rica, managed under the Osa Conservation Area. It was created in 1975 by decree 8494-A.

References 

Nature reserves in Costa Rica
Protected areas established in 1975